WIFO-FM (105.5 FM) is Jesup's FM heritage station, broadcasting a wide variety of programming, including mornings with Butch Hubbard, Local News with Bob Morgan, Local Sports; The only FM Atlanta Braves affiliate for Baxley, Hinesville,  Jesup, Waycross, Brunswick, and Camden County; Since 1971 the oldest continuous FM Braves Affiliate. WIFO also covers professional and college sports, as well as country music and the True Oldies Channel weekends. Licensed to Jesup, Georgia, United States;  The station is currently owned by Jesup Broadcasting Corp.

A fire December 7, 2005, destroyed the original studios. New permanent facilities located at the original site went online June 24, 2006. Since then, sister station WLOP has noticed a resurgence in listeners, due in part to Fox Sports Radio, and the addition of relevant local sports programming 24/7, including WCHS Softball on WLOP.

References

External links

IFO
Oldies radio stations in the United States
Country radio stations in the United States
Radio stations established in 2005